This is a list of the parliaments of the United Kingdom, of Great Britain and of England from 1660 to the present day, with the duration of each parliament. The NP number is the number counting forward from the creation of the United Kingdom in 1801 and Great Britain in 1707. Prior to that, the parliaments are counted from the Restoration in 1660.

The duration column is calculated from the date of the first meeting of the parliament to that of dissolution.

Parliaments from 1922

Notes

Parliaments 1801-1922

Notes

Parliaments 1705-1800

Notes

Parliaments before 1705

Key to abbreviations in the NP column:
 CP – Convention Parliament: In seventeenth century usage a convention was a body in the form of a parliament, which had been summoned by a de facto ruler rather than a de jure monarch. Once the convention had recognised a de jure sovereign it could then convert itself into a parliament. The 1660 convention restored King Charles II of England. The 1689–90 convention offered the throne jointly to King William III of England and Queen Mary II of England.
 KC2 – Parliament summoned by King Charles II of England.
 KJ2 – Parliament summoned by King James II of England.
 WM – Parliament summoned by King William III of England and Queen Mary II of England (before her death in 1694, after which her husband was sole monarch).
 QA – Parliament summoned by Queen Anne of England.

See also
Duration of English parliaments before 1660
List of British governments
List of parliaments of England
List of parliaments of Great Britain
List of parliaments of the United Kingdom
List of United Kingdom general elections

References

 

Duration
Parliaments of England
Political history of England
History of the British Isles
Duration
Political history of the United Kingdom
United Kingdom politics-related lists